The 2020 Qatar motorcycle Grand Prix was the first round of the 2020 Grand Prix motorcycle racing season. It was held at the Losail International Circuit in Doha on 8 March 2020. The MotoGP race was cancelled after Qatari quarantine measures were put in place as a response to the outbreak of coronavirus disease (COVID-19).  Because Moto2 and Moto3 teams were testing at Losail the previous week, teams were staying over in Qatar for that race and officials allowed them to participate in all scheduled events.

Classification

Moto2

 Sam Lowes withdrew from the event after Friday practice due to a shoulder injury.

Moto3

Championship standings after the race
Below are the standings for the top five riders, constructors, and teams after the round.

Moto2

Riders' Championship standings

Constructors' Championship standings

Teams' Championship standings

Moto3

Riders' Championship standings

Constructors' Championship standings

Teams' Championship standings

Notes

References

External links

Qatar
Motorcycle Grand Prix
Qatar motorcycle Grand Prix
Qatar motorcycle Grand Prix
Qatar motorcycle Grand Prix